Ana Kobal (born 11 November 1983 in Žirovnica) is a former Slovenian alpine skier. She competed in the 2006 Winter Olympics in Turin in Giant Slalom and Super-G. In Giant Slalom she was 9th and in Super-G 45th.

External links
 Ana Kobal on Sports-Reference.com

1983 births
Living people
Slovenian female alpine skiers
Olympic alpine skiers of Slovenia
Alpine skiers at the 2006 Winter Olympics
Universiade medalists in alpine skiing
People from Žirovnica, Žirovnica
Universiade silver medalists for Slovenia
Competitors at the 2007 Winter Universiade